Ivo Saúl Vázquez Serrano (born 16 October 2000) is a Mexican professional footballer who plays as a left-back for Liga MX club Puebla.

Career statistics

Club

References

External links
 
 
 

Living people
2000 births
Association football defenders
Club Puebla players
Liga MX players
Footballers from the State of Mexico
People from Toluca
Mexican footballers